Nemacheilus spiniferus is a species of cyprinid fish in the genus Nemacheilus from western and north western Borneo.

Footnotes 

 

S
Fish described in 1984